Untalan is a surname. Notable people with the surname include:
Cathy Untalan (born 1985), Filipina environmentalist and beauty queen
Lagrimas Untalan (1911–1997), Guamanian educator and politician

Pangasinan-language surnames
Tagalog-language surnames